So Nice to Meet You is the third EP by the pop punk band Punchline, released through Modern Short Stories on January 3, 2012.

Its success was attributed to word of mouth, social networking and a strong fan base created over the previous 14 years.

Track listing
 "Universe" – 3:29
 "Everything I Wanted" – 3:06
 "I Swear I've Been Here Before" – 3:34
 "Very Nervous System" – 2:55
 "I Want You to Want Me" – 3:57

Charts

References

Punchline (band) albums
2012 EPs